The Minnesota Golden Gophers college football team competes as part of the National Collegiate Athletic Association (NCAA) Division I Football Bowl Subdivision, representing the University of Minnesota in the West Division of the Big Ten Conference.Minnesota was one of seven original founding members of the Big Ten Conference, then known as the Western Conference, in 1896. The Big Ten Conference introduced divisional play in 2011; the divisional winners advance to the Big Ten Championship Game to determine the conference champion.

Since the team's first season in 1882, the Gophers have participated in more than 1,250 officially sanctioned games, including 20 bowl games, and have finished in the top 25 of the national polls 16 times. Minnesota claims seven national championships, most recently a consensus national championship in 1960, and has won at least a share of the conference championship 18 times, most recently in 1967.

Seasons

Notes

References

Lists of college football seasons
Minnesota Golden Gophers football seasons
Minnesota Golden Gophers football seasons